Mayking is an unincorporated community and census-designated place in Letcher County, Kentucky, United States. Its population was 487 as of the 2010 census. Mayking has a post office with ZIP code 41837, which opened on January 25, 1894. U.S. Route 119 passes through the community.

Geography

Demographics

References

Unincorporated communities in Letcher County, Kentucky
Unincorporated communities in Kentucky
Census-designated places in Letcher County, Kentucky
Census-designated places in Kentucky